Kat Richardson (born May 22, 1964) is an American author best known for her Greywalker urban fantasy series.

Biography
In addition to the Greywalker series, Kat has published in other text forms and media, including role-playing games, video games, and comics as well as magazine writing, technical writing, and curriculum writing and editing. She is married and lives in Seattle, Washington, and is an advocate of California Ferret Legalization.

Greywalker series
The Greywalker series consists of nine novels. In the 9th novel, Richardson states, "This is the last Greywalker novel, at least for a while." Harper Blaine, the heroine of the series, is a private investigator living in Seattle and was killed whilst pursuing a case. She was dead for only two minutes and brought back by medical intervention. During her recovery, she discovers she is able to recognize witches and vampires, see ghosts and is aware of other elements of the supernatural world . She discovers that her brief death has turned her into a Greywalker, a human able to move back and forth at will through the Grey, the realm that exists between our world and the next.

Bibliography

Greywalker series 
Greywalker (October 2006)
Poltergeist (August 2007)
Underground (August 2008)
Vanished (August 2009)
Labyrinth (August 2010)
Downpour (August 2011)
Seawitch (August 2012)
Possession (August 2013)
Revenant (August 2014)

See also

List of fantasy authors

References

External links
Kat Richardson official site

1964 births
Living people
21st-century American novelists
American fantasy writers
American women novelists
Urban fantasy writers
Women science fiction and fantasy writers
21st-century American women writers
Place of birth missing (living people)